Jean Piaubert (27 January 1900 – 28 January 2002) was a French painter.

1900 births
2002 deaths
Abstract painters
20th-century French painters
20th-century French male artists
French male painters
21st-century French painters
21st-century French male artists
French abstract artists